The 1972–73 Primeira Divisão was the 39th season of top-tier football in Portugal.

Overview
It was contested by 16 teams. S.L. Benfica won the championship, with 28 victories, 0 losses and 2 draws.

League standings

Results

Season statistics

Top goalscorers

References

External links
 Portugal 1972-73 - RSSSF (Jorge Miguel Teixeira)
 Portuguese League 1972/73 - footballzz.co.uk
 Portugal - Table of Honor - Soccer Library

Primeira Liga seasons
1972–73 in Portuguese football
Portugal